Taylor-Manning-Leppo House is a historic home located near Finksburg, Carroll County, Maryland. The original section was built about 1860, and is a 2 ½-story log and frame bank house.  It rests on a stone foundation, with an exposed full story in height across the front of the building.

It was listed on the National Register of Historic Places in 2009.

References

External links
, including photo in 1989, at Maryland Historical Trust

Houses on the National Register of Historic Places in Maryland
Houses completed in 1860
Houses in Carroll County, Maryland
National Register of Historic Places in Carroll County, Maryland